Arhabdosia is a genus of moths in the subfamily Arctiinae. It contains the single species Arhabdosia subvarda, which is found in French Guiana.

References

Natural History Museum Lepidoptera generic names catalog

Lithosiini
Monotypic moth genera
Moths of South America